Belgium competed at the 1960 Summer Olympics in Rome, Italy. 101 competitors, 93 men and 8 women, took part in 64 events in 16 sports.

Medalists

Silver
 Roger Moens — Athletics, Men's 800 metres
 Leo Sterckx — Cycling, Men's sprint

Bronze
 Willy van den Berghen — Cycling, Men's individual road race
 André Nelis — Sailing, Men's Finn class

Athletics

Boxing

Canoeing

Cycling

13 cyclists, all men, represented Belgium in 1960.

Individual road race
 Willy Vanden Berghen
 Benoni Beheyt
 Robert Lelangue
 Joseph Geurts

Team time trial
 Benoni Beheyt
 Willy Monty
 Willy Vanden Berghen
 Yvan Covent

Sprint
 Leo Sterckx
 Gilbert De Rieck

1000m time trial
 Jean Govaerts

Team pursuit
 Romain De Loof
 Barthélemy Gillard
 Frans Melckenbeeck
 Charles Rabaey

Equestrian

Fencing

15 fencers, 12 men and 3 women, represented Belgium in 1960.

Men's foil
 André Verhalle
 Franck Delhem
 Jacques Debeur

Men's team foil
 Jacques Debeur, André Verhalle, François Dehez, Franck Delhem

Men's épée
 Roger Achten
 François Dehez
 René Van Den Driessche

Men's team épée
 Pierre Francisse, René Van Den Driessche, Jacques Debeur, Roger Achten, François Dehez

Men's sabre
 Marcel Van Der Auwera
 José Van Baelen
 Gustave Ballister

Men's team sabre
 José Van Baelen, Gustave Ballister, Marcel Van Der Auwera, François Heywaert, Roger Petit

Women's foil
 Jacqueline Appart
 Marie Melchers
 Claudine Wallet

Gymnastics

Hockey

Modern pentathlon

One male pentathlete represented Belgium in 1960.

Individual
 Arsène Pint

Rowing

Belgium had 5 male rowers participate in two out of seven rowing events in 1960.

 Men's double sculls
 Gérard Higny
 Jean-Marie Lemaire

 Men's coxed pair
 Roland Bollenberg
 Edgard Luca
 Étienne Pollet

Sailing

Shooting

Three shooters represented Belgium in 1960.

50 m pistol
 Marcel Lafortune

50 m rifle, three positions
 Jacques Lafortune
 Frans Lafortune

50 m rifle, prone
 Frans Lafortune
 Jacques Lafortune

Swimming

Water polo

Weightlifting

Wrestling

References

External links
Official Olympic Reports
International Olympic Committee results database

Nations at the 1960 Summer Olympics
1960
Olympics